Song Vân is a commune (xã) and village in Tân Yên District (huyện), Bắc Giang Province (tỉnh), in northeastern Vietnam.

References

Populated places in Bắc Giang province
Communes of Bắc Giang province